Earl of Carrick, in the barony of Iffa and Offa East, County Tipperary, is a title in the Peerage of Ireland.

First creation
The title was first created in 1315 for Sir Edmund Butler, Justiciar of Ireland, by King Edward II. The title is linked to the manor of Karryk Mac Gryffin (the modern town of Carrick-on-Suir) in the barony of Iffa and Offa East, County Tipperary. Edmund was the father of James Butler, 1st Earl of Ormond, and John Butler of Clonamicklon. However, upon his death in 1321, the earldom was not inherited by his son and heir.

Later, with the second creation of the title, it was bestowed on the descendants of his second son, John, who became Viscounts Ikerrin and Earls of Carrick. Sir Edmund Butler had distinguished himself in the fight against the Bruce invasion of Ireland.

Second creation
In 1629, Lieutenant-General Sir Pierce Butler was raised to the Peerage of Ireland as Viscount Ikerrin. He was the descendant of John Butler of Clonamicklon, the second son of Edmund Butler, Earl of Carrick. The Viscount's great-great-grandson, the 4th Viscount, sat in the Irish Parliament of James II and was outlawed in 1689 after the accession of William III and Mary II. However, the outlawry was annulled in 1698 and he was able to take his seat in the Irish House of Lords. Lord Ikerrin later achieved the military rank of Brigadier-General.

His son, the 5th Viscount, died at an early age and was succeeded by his uncle, the 6th Viscount. He was a Protestant clergyman. His eldest son, the 7th Viscount, died as a child and was succeeded by his younger brother, Somerset Hamilton Butler. In 1748, the 8th Viscount Ikerrin was made Earl of Carrick in the Peerage of Ireland in memorial of his remote ancestor, John Butler, mentioned above.

His eldest son, the 2nd Earl, represented Killyleagh in the Irish House of Commons. He then was succeeded by his eldest son, the 3rd Earl. He sat in the British House of Lords as an Irish Representative Peer between 1819 and 1838. His second son, the fifth Earl (who succeeded his elder brother), was a Captain in the Grenadier Guards and fought in the Crimean War.

He died unmarried and was succeeded by his first cousin once removed, the sixth Earl. He was the grandson of Lieutenant-General the Hon. Henry Edward Butler, second son of the second Earl. Lord Carrick was a Major in the Welsh Regiment. His son, the seventh Earl, was Comptroller of the Household to the Lord Lieutenant of Ireland from 1913 to 1915 and fought in the First World War, where he was mentioned in despatches. Lord Carrick had already in 1912 been created Baron Butler of Mount Juliet, in the County of Kilkenny, in the Peerage of the United Kingdom, which gave him an automatic seat in the House of Lords.  the titles are held by his great-great-grandson, the eleventh Earl, who succeeded his father in 2008.

The family seat was Mount Juliet, near Thomastown, County Kilkenny.

Viscounts Ikerrin (1629)
 Pierce Butler, 1st Viscount Ikerrin (died )
 Pierce Butler, 2nd Viscount Ikerrin (1637 – c. 1680)
 James Butler, 3rd Viscount Ikerrin (died 1688)
 Pierce Butler, 4th Viscount Ikerrin (1679–1710/11)
 James Butler, 5th Viscount Ikerrin (1698–1712)
 Thomas Butler, 6th Viscount Ikerrin (1683–1719)
 James Butler, 7th Viscount Ikerrin (1714–1721)
 Somerset Butler, 8th Viscount Ikerrin (1719–1774) (created Earl of Carrick in 1748)

Earls of Carrick (1748)
 Somerset Butler, 1st Earl of Carrick (1719–1774)
 Henry Butler, 2nd Earl of Carrick (1746–1813)
 Somerset Butler, 3rd Earl of Carrick (1779–1838)
 Henry Butler, 4th Earl of Carrick (1834–1846)
 Somerset Arthur Butler, 5th Earl of Carrick (1835–1901)
 Charles Henry Somerset Butler, 6th Earl of Carrick (1851–1909)
 Charles Ernest Alfred French Somerset Butler, 7th Earl of Carrick (1873–1931), created Baron Butler [UK] in 1912
 Theobald Walter Somerset Henry Butler, 8th Earl of Carrick (1903–1957)
 Brian Stuart Theobald Somerset Caher Butler, 9th Earl of Carrick (1931–1992)
 David James Theobald Somerset Butler, 10th Earl of Carrick (1953–2008)
 (Arion) Thomas Piers Hamilton Butler, 11th Earl of Carrick (born 1975)

Present peer
Arion Thomas Piers Hamilton Butler, 11th Earl of Carrick (born 1 September 1975) is the elder son of the 10th Earl and his wife Philippa Janice Victoria Craxton. Styled as Viscount Ikerrin from birth, on 8 January 2008 he succeeded as Earl of Carrick and to the other peerages.

As of 2019, the heir presumptive was his younger brother Piers Edmund Theobald Lismalyn Butler (born 1979).

 Charles Butler, 7th Earl of Carrick (1873–1931)
 Theobald Butler, 8th Earl of Carrick (1903–1957)
 Brian Butler, 9th Earl of Carrick (1931–1992)
 David Butler, 10th Earl of Carrick (1953–2008)
 (Arion) Thomas Butler, 11th Earl of Carrick (b. 1975)
(1). Hon. Piers Edmund Theobald Lismalyn Butler (b. 1979) 
(2). Hon. Lindsay Simon Turville Somerset Butler (b. 1979)
Hon. Guy Somerset Lionel Butler (1905–1983)
Rupert Lionel Somerset Butler (1940–2020)
(3). Piers Somerset Patrick Butler (b. 1970)
(4). Guy Somerset Hugh Butler (b. 2008)
(5). Luke Somerset Rupert Butler (b. 2010)
(6). Eli Somerset James Butler (b. 1971)
(7). Matthew Somerset Guy Butler (b. 1972)
(8). Sebastian Somerset Lionel Butler (b. 1979)
(9).  Dermot Somerset Launcelot Butler (b. 1941) 
Hon. Pierce Alan Somerset David Butler (1909–1964)
David Llewelyn Somerset Butler (1937–2017)
(10). Michael Somerset Butler (b. 1966)

See also
 Butler dynasty

Notes

References 
Kidd, Charles, Williamson, David (editors). Debrett's Peerage and Baronetage (1990 edition). New York: St Martin's Press, 1990, 

 Ormond, Duke of, Life 1610–'88: Thomas A. Carte, M.A. 6 vols. Oxford, 1851.

External links

Earldoms in the Peerage of Ireland
Extinct earldoms in the Peerage of Ireland
Butler dynasty
 
Noble titles created in 1315
Noble titles created in 1748

es:Condado de Carrick
fr:Comte de Carrick
no:Jarl av Carrick
pl:Hrabia Carrick